Janos Galambos (Galambos János in Hungarian, Born Zirc, Hungary, 1 September 1940 –  19 December 2019) was a Hungarian mathematician affiliated with Temple University in Philadelphia, Pennsylvania, USA.

Education and career 
Galambos earned his Ph.D. in 1963 from Eötvös Loránd University, under the supervision of Alfréd Rényi. He remained at the Eötvös Loránd University as an assistant professor from 1964 to 1965. He was lecturer at the University of Ghana from 1965 to 1969. In 1970, Galambos joined the faculty of Temple University in Philadelphia and remained there until his retirement in 2012.

Galambos worked on probability theory, number theory, order statistics, and many other sub-specialties, and published hundreds of papers and many books.

In 1993 he was elected external member of the Hungarian Academy of Sciences, and in 2001 he became a corresponding member of the Spanish Royal Academy of Engineering.

Selected books

References

External links 
 Janos Galambos in the Oberwolfach Photo Collection

1940 births
2019 deaths
20th-century American mathematicians
20th-century Hungarian mathematicians
21st-century American mathematicians
21st-century Hungarian mathematicians
Hungarian emigrants to the United States
Members of the Hungarian Academy of Sciences
Probability theorists
Eötvös Loránd University alumni
Temple University faculty
People from Veszprém County
Mathematical statisticians
Academic staff of the University of Ghana